Perpetual Motion is an independent Chinese film directed by Ning Ying. The film follows four wealthy, high-powered women living in Beijing during the Chinese New Year.  The film had its North American premiere on September 10, 2005 at the 2005 Toronto International Film Festival.  Perpetual Motion was co-written by Ning, musician and author Liu Sola, and publisher Hung Huang (Hung and Liu also star) and was produced by Beijing Happy Village, Ltd.

The film opened in Chinese cities in late February 2006 to some controversy due to its depiction of assertive, sexually confident women. The version shown was slightly edited compared to the version shown abroad in Toronto and Venice, with some of the more explicit discussions on sex as well as a scene involving the four main characters listening to an old revolutionary song in high heels and makeup being edited or cut. Given its content, Perpetual Motion is often referred to as a Chinese version of the American television series Sex and the City.

Plot 
Niuniu, a wealthy middle aged woman living in Beijing, discovers that her husband is having an affair after coming upon a romantic e-mail. She knows only that it is one of her close friends but not which one. Determined to discover the truth, she invites her friends Qinqin, a ditsy actress, Lala, a successful artist, and Madam Ye, a property developer over to her lavish siheyuan home. There the four women share stories of their sexual past over food and mahjong. Niuniu, however, still has her plan to execute...

Cast 
Hung Huang as Niuniu; Hung Huang, a publisher in reality, plays the main character, a high powered woman in Beijing who invites her three friends to dinner on Lunar New Year's Eve for the purpose of discovering which of her friends is having an affair with her husband.
Li Qinqin as Qinqin, an actress; Li Qinqin unlike the other three "actresses" is a professional performer.
Liu Sola as Lala, a successful artist; author and musician Liu Sola also served as the film's music composer and shared co-screenwriter's credit.
Ping Yanni as Madam Ye, a property developer; Ping Yanni is an actual businesswoman working in Beijing.
Zhang Hanzi as Niuniu's maid and cook; Zhang Hanzi, actually Hung Huang's mother, served as one of the English translators for Mao Zedong in her younger days.

Reception 
Though the film's concept of four middle-aged wealthy Chinese women engaging in frank discussions of sex raised eyebrows, the execution of that concept was ultimately found lacking by many western critics. Derek Elley of Variety, for example, suggested that the film's "script remains unfocused," and that its uneven performances (from non-professionals) consigned the film to the festival circuit. Other reviewers noted that "Some of the talk is intriguing, but only some," while another felt that "with the action confined to one room, the film is too much like a play, and, rather dull in execution, it lacks the atmosphere it needs to capitalise on its premise."

References

External links 

Perpetual Motion at the Chinese Movie Database

Chinese drama films
2005 films
2000s Mandarin-language films
2005 drama films
Films set in Beijing
Films directed by Ning Ying